Reese Technology Center is a research and business park located on the grounds of former Reese Air Force Base in western Lubbock at the unincorporated community of Reese Center.

History

Reese Technology Center began as the Lubbock Army Air Corps Advanced Flying School in 1942. It was renamed Lubbock Army Flying School in 1943 and then Lubbock Army Airfield later that same year. In 1949, it was renamed Reese Air Force Base in honor of a local West Texas pilot, Augustus F. Reese, Jr., who was killed in a bombing raid over Italy during World War II.

Over the years, many milestones were accomplished at Reese Air Force Base, including a special pilot training program, the first flight simulator used in a training program, and a joint pilot training program with the Navy.  More than 25,000 pilots, who fought in every conflict since World War II, were trained at Reese.

In 1995, word reached the Lubbock community that Reese Air Force Base was on the Pentagon’s list for base closures. In spite of much opposition from community members and leaders alike, the base closure was announced for September 30, 1997. The Lubbock Reese Redevelopment Committee (LRRC) was created in 1995, just two weeks after the base was recommended to be closed.

The Lubbock Reese Redevelopment Committee was renamed the Redevelopment Authority (LRRA) and could now execute contracts for base property. This committee was composed of local government officials and area business people. 

In the years since Reese AFB closure, investigations have occurred to look into the per-and poly-fluoroalkyl substances (PFAS) around the former base. Before Reese Air Force Base closed it was home to training Air Force Firefighters to extinguish life-threatening fires using foam containing PFAS. After using this substance for many years at the base it began seeping into the groundwater. The Air Force is continually checking bases for PFAS to this day. Past Reese AFB residents are entitled to compensation if found to the following toxins: Testicular cancer, Renal (kidney) cancer, and Prostate cancer. Here is a link to the Air Force's investigation into PFAS at Reese AFB. https://www.af.mil/News/Article-Display/Article/2295836/air-force-begins-field-work-to-investigate-pfas-at-former-reese-afb/

See also
Llano Estacado
West Texas

References

External links
 Official website

Education in Lubbock, Texas
Buildings and structures in Lubbock County, Texas
1942 establishments in Texas